Michelle D. Commander is a historian and author, and serves as Deputy Director of Research and Strategic Initiatives at the Schomburg Center for Research in Black Culture.

Education 
Commander received her BA in English from Charleston Southern University and completed a M.S. in Curriculum and Instruction at Florida State University before completing a MA and PhD in American Studies and Ethnicity at the University of Southern California.

Career 
Before joining the Lapidus Center, Commander worked as associate professor of English and Africana Studies at the University of Tennessee. She serves as faculty for Rare Book School, and is an author at Ms. Magazine.

Commander served as consulting curator and literary scholar for the Metropolitan Museum of Art's Afrofuturism period room, Before Yesterday We Could Fly, which opened in November 2021.

Scholarship 
Commander's work focuses on slavery and memory, diaspora studies, literary studies, Afrofuturism, and Black social movements. Her publications include Afro-Atlantic Flight: Speculative Returns and the Black Fantastic (Duke University Press 2017), and Avidly Reads Passages (NYU Press 2021). She is editor of Unsung: Unheralded Narratives of American Slavery & Abolition, an anthology of Black history spanning transatlantic slavery to Reconstruction. Her focus on Black mobility, slavery, diasporic longing and speculative futures is evident in her influence on Before Yesterday We Could Fly at the Metropolitan Museum of Art.

Awards 
Commander is a Ford Foundation scholar and is the recipient of a Fulbright grant which funded teaching and research in Ghana in 2012-2013.

References 

Afrofuturism
Living people
New York Public Library people
University of Southern California alumni
Year of birth missing (living people)
American women curators
American curators
American women historians